The Bloch MB.500 was a French low-wing monoplane trainer developed by Société des Avions Marcel Bloch.

Specifications (MB.500)

See also

References

MB.500
Low-wing aircraft
Aircraft first flown in 1938
Twin piston-engined tractor aircraft
1930s French aircraft